This is a list of the bird species recorded in the Czech Republic. The avifauna of the Czech Republic includes (as of December 2021) a total of 429 species, but this number may change as a major re-evaluation of both historical and contemporary records is currently underway. Of these 429 species, 8 have been introduced by humans.

This list's taxonomic treatment (designation and sequence of orders, families and species) and nomenclature (common and scientific names) follow the conventions of The Clements Checklist of Birds of the World, 2022 edition. The family accounts at the beginning of each heading reflect this taxonomy, as do the species counts found in each family account. Introduced and accidental species are included in the total counts for the Czech Republic.

The following tags have been used to highlight several categories. The commonly occurring native species do not fall into any of these categories.

(A) Accidental - a species that rarely or accidentally occurs in the Czech Republic
(I) Introduced - a species introduced to the Czech Republic as a consequence, direct or indirect, of human actions

Ducks, geese, and waterfowl
Order: AnseriformesFamily: Anatidae

Anatidae includes the ducks and most duck-like waterfowl, such as geese and swans. These birds are adapted to an aquatic existence with webbed feet, flattened bills, and feathers that are excellent at shedding water due to an oily coating.

Snow goose, Anser caerulescens (A)
Graylag goose, Anser anser
Greater white-fronted goose, Anser albifrons
Lesser white-fronted goose, Anser erythropus (A)
Taiga bean-goose, Anser fabalis
Tundra bean-goose, Anser serrirostris
Pink-footed goose, Anser brachyrhynchus (A)
Brant, Branta bernicla
Barnacle goose, Branta leucopsis (A)
Cackling goose, Branta hutchinsii (A)
Canada goose, Branta canadensis (I)
Red-breasted goose, Branta ruficollis (A)
Mute swan, Cygnus olor
Tundra swan, Cygnus columbianus (A)
Whooper swan, Cygnus cygnus
Egyptian goose, Alopochen aegyptiacus (I)
Ruddy shelduck, Tadorna ferruginea
Common shelduck, Tadorna tadorna
Wood duck, Aix sponsa (I)
Mandarin duck, Aix galericulata (I)
Garganey, Spatula querquedula
Blue-winged teal, Spatula discors (A)
Northern shoveler, Spatula clypeata
Gadwall, Mareca strepera
Eurasian wigeon, Mareca penelope
American wigeon, Mareca americana (A)
Mallard, Anas platyrhynchos
Northern pintail, Anas acuta
Green-winged teal, Anas crecca
Marbled teal, Marmaronetta angustirostris (A)
Red-crested pochard, Netta rufina
Canvasback, Aythya valisineria (A)
Common pochard, Aythya ferina
Ring-necked duck, Aythya collaris (A)
Ferruginous duck, Aythya nyroca
Tufted duck, Aythya fuligula
Greater scaup, Aythya marila
Steller's eider, Polysticta stelleri (A)
King eider, Somateria spectabilis (A)
Common eider, Somateria mollissima
Velvet scoter, Melanitta fusca
Common scoter, Melanitta nigra
Long-tailed duck, Clangula hyemalis
Common goldeneye, Bucephala clangula
Barrow's goldeneye, Bucephala islandica (A)
Smew, Mergellus albellus
Common merganser, Mergus merganser
Red-breasted merganser, Mergus serrator
Ruddy duck, Oxyura jamaicensis (A)
White-headed duck, Oxyura leucocephala (A)

Pheasants, grouse, and allies
Order: GalliformesFamily: Phasianidae

The Phasianidae are a family of terrestrial birds. In general, they are plump (although they vary in size) and have broad, relatively short wings.

Common quail, Coturnix coturnix
Reeves's pheasant, Syrmaticus reevesii (I)
Ring-necked pheasant, Phasianus colchicus (I)
Gray partridge, Perdix perdix
Western capercaillie, Tetrao urogallus
Black grouse, Lyrurus tetrix
Hazel grouse, Tetrastes bonasia

Flamingoes
Order: PhoenicopteriformesFamily: Phoenicopteridae

Flamingos filter-feed on shellfish and algae. Their oddly shaped beaks are specially adapted to separate mud and silt from the food they consume and, uniquely, are used upside-down.

Greater flamingo, Phoenicopterus roseus (A)

Grebes
Order: PodicipediformesFamily: Podicipedidae

Grebes are small to medium-large diving birds with lobed toes and pointed bills. They are seen mainly on lowland waterbodies and coasts. They feed on aquatic animals and nest on a floating platform of vegetation.

Little grebe, Tachybaptus ruficollis
Horned grebe, Podiceps auritus
Red-necked grebe, Podiceps grisegena
Great crested grebe, Podiceps cristatus
Eared grebe, Podiceps nigricollis

Pigeons and doves
Order: ColumbiformesFamily: Columbidae

Pigeons and doves are stout-bodied birds with short necks and short slender bills with a fleshy cere. 

Rock pigeon, Columba livia (I)
Stock dove, Columba oenas
Common wood-pigeon, Columba palumbus
European turtle-dove, Streptopelia turtur
Eurasian collared-dove, Streptopelia decaocto

Sandgrouse
Order: PterocliformesFamily: Pteroclidae

Sandgrouse have small, pigeon like heads and necks, but sturdy compact bodies. They have long pointed wings and sometimes tails and a fast direct flight. Flocks fly to watering holes at dawn and dusk. Their legs are feathered down to the toes. 

Pallas's sandgrouse, Syrrhaptes paradoxus (A)

Bustards
Order: OtidiformesFamily: Otididae

Bustards are large terrestrial birds mainly associated with dry open country and steppes in the Old World. They are omnivorous and nest on the ground. They walk steadily on strong legs and big toes, pecking for food as they go. They have long broad wings with "fingered" wingtips and striking patterns in flight. Many have interesting mating displays.

Great bustard, Otis tarda
Macqueen's bustard, Chlamydotis macqueenii (A)
Little bustard, Tetrax tetrax (A)(extirpated)

Cuckoos
Order: CuculiformesFamily: Cuculidae

The family Cuculidae includes cuckoos, roadrunners and anis. These birds are of variable size with slender bodies, long tails and strong legs. The Old World cuckoos are brood parasites.

Common cuckoo, Cuculus canorus

Nightjars and allies 
Order: CaprimulgiformesFamily: Caprimulgidae

Nightjars are medium-sized nocturnal birds that usually nest on the ground. They have long wings, short legs and very short bills. Most have small feet, of little use for walking, and long pointed wings. Their soft plumage is camouflaged to resemble bark or leaves.

Eurasian nightjar, Caprimulgus europaeus

Swifts
Order: CaprimulgiformesFamily: Apodidae

Swifts are small birds which spend the majority of their lives flying. These birds have very short legs and never settle voluntarily on the ground, perching instead only on vertical surfaces. Many swifts have long swept-back wings which resemble a crescent or boomerang.

Alpine swift, Apus melba (A)
Common swift, Apus apus

Rails, gallinules and coots
Order: GruiformesFamily: Rallidae

Rallidae is a large family of small to medium-sized birds which includes the rails, crakes, coots and gallinules. Typically they inhabit dense vegetation in damp environments near lakes, swamps or rivers. In general they are shy and secretive birds, making them difficult to observe. Most species have strong legs and long toes which are well adapted to soft uneven surfaces. They tend to have short, rounded wings and to be weak fliers.

Water rail, Rallus aquaticus
Corn crake, Crex crex
Spotted crake, Porzana porzana
Eurasian moorhen, Gallinula chloropus
Eurasian coot, Fulica atra
Western swamphen, Porphyrio porphyrio (A)
African swamphen, Porphyrio madagascariensis (A)
Little crake, Zapornia parva
Baillon's crake, Zapornia pusilla (A)

Cranes
Order: GruiformesFamily: Gruidae

Cranes are large, long-legged and long-necked birds. Unlike the similar-looking but unrelated herons, cranes fly with necks outstretched, not pulled back. Most have elaborate and noisy courting displays or "dances". 

Common crane, Grus grus

Thick-knees
Order: CharadriiformesFamily: Burhinidae

The thick-knees are a group of largely tropical waders in the family Burhinidae. They are found worldwide within the tropical zone, with some species also breeding in temperate Europe and Australia. They are medium to large waders with strong black or yellow-black bills, large yellow eyes and cryptic plumage. Despite being classed as waders, most species have a preference for arid or semi-arid habitats. 

Eurasian thick-knee, Burhinus oedicnemus

Stilts and avocets
Order: CharadriiformesFamily: Recurvirostridae

Recurvirostridae is a family of large wading birds, which includes the avocets and stilts. The avocets have long legs and long up-curved bills. The stilts have extremely long legs and long, thin, straight bills.

Black-winged stilt, Himantopus himantopus
Pied avocet, Recurvirostra avosetta

Oystercatchers
Order: CharadriiformesFamily: Haematopodidae

The oystercatchers are large and noisy plover-like birds, with strong bills used for smashing or prising open molluscs.

Eurasian oystercatcher, Haematopus ostralegus

Plovers and lapwings
Order: CharadriiformesFamily: Charadriidae

The family Charadriidae includes the plovers, dotterels and lapwings. They are small to medium-sized birds with compact bodies, short, thick necks and long, usually pointed, wings. They are found in open country worldwide, mostly in habitats near water. 

Black-bellied plover, Pluvialis squatarola
European golden-plover, Pluvialis apricaria
American golden-plover, Pluvialis dominica (A)
Pacific golden-plover, Pluvialis fulva (A)
Northern lapwing, Vanellus vanellus
Spur-winged lapwing, Vanellus spinosus (A)
Sociable lapwing, Vanellus gregarius (A)
White-tailed lapwing, Vanellus leucurus (A)
Kentish plover, Charadrius alexandrinus (A)
Common ringed plover, Charadrius hiaticula
Little ringed plover, Charadrius dubius
Eurasian dotterel, Charadrius morinellus

Sandpipers and allies
Order: CharadriiformesFamily: Scolopacidae

Scolopacidae is a large diverse family of small to medium-sized shorebirds including the sandpipers, curlews, godwits, shanks, tattlers, woodcocks, snipes, dowitchers and phalaropes. The majority of these species eat small invertebrates picked out of the mud or soil. Variation in length of legs and bills enables multiple species to feed in the same habitat, particularly on the coast, without direct competition for food. 

Whimbrel, Numenius phaeopus
Slender-billed curlew, Numenius tenuirostris (A)
Eurasian curlew, Numenius arquata
Bar-tailed godwit, Limosa lapponica
Black-tailed godwit, Limosa limosa
Ruddy turnstone, Arenaria interpres
Red knot, Calidris canutus
Ruff, Calidris pugnax
Broad-billed sandpiper, Calidris falcinellus
Curlew sandpiper, Calidris ferruginea
Temminck's stint, Calidris temminckii
Red-necked stint, Calidris ruficollis (A)
Sanderling, Calidris alba
Dunlin, Calidris alpina
Purple sandpiper, Calidris maritima (A)
Baird's sandpiper, Calidris bairdii (A)
Little stint, Calidris minuta
White-rumped sandpiper, Calidris fuscicollis (A)
Buff-breasted sandpiper, Calidris subruficollis (A)
Pectoral sandpiper, Calidris melanotos (A)
Jack snipe, Lymnocryptes minimus
Eurasian woodcock, Scolopax rusticola
Great snipe, Gallinago media
Common snipe, Gallinago gallinago
Terek sandpiper, Xenus cinereus (A)
Red-necked phalarope, Phalaropus lobatus
Red phalarope, Phalaropus fulicarius (A)
Common sandpiper, Actitis hypoleucos
Green sandpiper, Tringa ochropus
Spotted redshank, Tringa erythropus
Greater yellowlegs, Tringa melanoleuca (A)
Common greenshank, Tringa nebularia
Lesser yellowlegs, Tringa flavipes (A)
Marsh sandpiper, Tringa stagnatilis
Wood sandpiper, Tringa glareola
Common redshank, Tringa totanus

Pratincoles and coursers
Order: CharadriiformesFamily: Glareolidae

Glareolidae is a family of wading birds comprising the pratincoles, which have short legs, long pointed wings and long forked tails, and the coursers, which have long legs, short wings and long, pointed bills which curve downwards.

Cream-colored courser, Cursorius cursor (A)
Collared pratincole, Glareola pratincola (A)
Black-winged pratincole, Glareola nordmanni (A)

Skuas and jaegers
Order: CharadriiformesFamily: Stercorariidae

The family Stercorariidae are, in general, medium to large birds, typically with grey or brown plumage, often with white markings on the wings. They nest on the ground in temperate and arctic regions and are long-distance migrants.

Great skua, Stercorarius skua (A)
Pomarine jaeger, Stercorarius pomarinus
Parasitic jaeger, Stercorarius parasiticus
Long-tailed jaeger, Stercorarius longicaudus (A)

Auks, murres and puffins
Order: CharadriiformesFamily: Alcidae

Alcids are superficially similar to penguins due to their black-and-white colours, their upright posture and some of their habits, however they are not related to the penguins and differ in being able to fly. Auks live on the open sea, only deliberately coming ashore to nest.

Dovekie, Alle alle (A)
Common murre, Uria aalge (A)
Razorbill, Alca torda (A)
Black guillemot, Cepphus grylle (A)

Gulls, terns, and skimmers
Order: CharadriiformesFamily: Laridae

Laridae is a family of medium to large seabirds, the gulls, terns, and skimmers. Gulls are typically grey or white, often with black markings on the head or wings. They have stout, longish bills and webbed feet. Terns are a group of generally medium to large seabirds typically with grey or white plumage, often with black markings on the head. Most terns hunt fish by diving but some pick insects off the surface of fresh water. Terns are generally long-lived birds, with several species known to live in excess of 30 years.

Black-legged kittiwake, Rissa tridactyla (A)
Sabine's gull, Xema sabini (A)
Slender-billed gull, Chroicocephalus genei (A)
Bonaparte's gull, Chroicocephalus philadelphia (A)
Black-headed gull, Chroicocephalus ridibundus
Little gull, Hydrocoloeus minutus
Mediterranean gull, Ichthyaetus melanocephalus
Pallas's gull, Ichthyaetus ichthyaetus (A)
Audouin's gull, Ichthyaetus audouinii (A)
Common gull, Larus canus
Ring-billed gull, Larus delawarensis (A)
Herring Gull, Larus argentatus
Yellow-legged gull, Larus michahellis 
Caspian gull, Larus cachinnans
Iceland gull, Larus glaucoides
Lesser black-backed gull, Larus fuscus
Glaucous gull, Larus hyperboreus (A)
Great black-backed gull, Larus marinus
Little tern, Sternula albifrons
Gull-billed tern, Gelochelidon nilotica (A)
Caspian tern, Hydroprogne caspia
Black tern, Chlidonias niger
White-winged tern, Chlidonias leucopterus
Whiskered tern, Chlidonias hybrida
Common tern, Sterna hirundo
Arctic tern, Sterna paradisaea (A)
Sandwich tern, Thalasseus sandvicensis

Loons
Order: GaviiformesFamily: Gaviidae

Loons, known as divers in Europe, are a group of aquatic birds found in many parts of North America and northern Europe. They are the size of a large duck or small goose, which they somewhat resemble when swimming, but to which they are completely unrelated. 

Red-throated loon, Gavia stellata
Arctic loon, Gavia arctica
Common loon, Gavia immer (A)
Yellow-billed loon, Gavia adamsii (A)

Northern storm-petrels
Order: ProcellariiformesFamily: Hydrobatidae

The northern storm-petrels are the smallest seabirds, feeding on plankton and small fish picked from the surface, typically while hovering. They nest in colonies on the ground, most often in burrows.

European storm-petrel, Hydrobates pelagicus (A)

Shearwaters and petrels
Order: ProcellariiformesFamily: Procellariidae

The procellariids are the main group of medium-sized "true petrels", characterised by united nostrils with medium septum and a long outer functional primary. 

Northern fulmar, Fulmarus glacialis (A)
Cory's shearwater, Calonectris diomedea (A)

Storks
Order: CiconiiformesFamily: Ciconiidae

Storks are large, long-legged, long-necked, wading birds with long, stout bills. Storks are mute, but bill-clattering is an important mode of communication at the nest. Their nests can be large and may be reused for many years. Many species are migratory.

Black stork, Ciconia nigra
White stork, Ciconia ciconia

Boobies and gannets
Order: SuliformesFamily: Sulidae

The sulids comprise the gannets and boobies. Both groups are medium to large coastal seabirds that plunge-dive for fish.

Northern gannet, Morus bassanus (A)

Cormorants and shags
Order: SuliformesFamily: Phalacrocoracidae

Phalacrocoracidae is a family of medium to large coastal, fish-eating seabirds that includes cormorants and shags. Plumage colouration varies, with the majority having mainly dark plumage, some species being black-and-white and a few being colourful.

Pygmy cormorant, Microcarbo pygmaeus (A)
Great cormorant, Phalacrocorax carbo
European shag, Gulosus aristotelis (A)

Pelicans
Order: PelecaniformesFamily: Pelecanidae

Pelicans are large water birds with a distinctive pouch under their beak. As with other members of the order Pelecaniformes, they have webbed feet with four toes.

Great white pelican, Pelecanus onocrotalus

Herons, egrets, and bitterns
Order: PelecaniformesFamily: Ardeidae

The family Ardeidae contains the bitterns, herons and egrets. Herons and egrets are medium to large wading birds with long necks and legs. Bitterns tend to be shorter necked and more wary. Members of Ardeidae fly with their necks retracted, unlike other long-necked birds such as storks, ibises and spoonbills.

Great bittern, Botaurus stellaris
Little bittern, Ixobrychus minutus
Gray heron, Ardea cinerea
Purple heron, Ardea purpurea
Great egret, Ardea alba
Little egret, Egretta garzetta
Cattle egret, Bubulcus ibis 
Squacco heron, Ardeola ralloides (A)
Black-crowned night-heron, Nycticorax nycticorax

Ibises and spoonbills
Order: PelecaniformesFamily: Threskiornithidae

Threskiornithidae is a family of large terrestrial and wading birds which includes the ibises and spoonbills. They have long, broad wings with 11 primary and about 20 secondary feathers. They are strong fliers and despite their size and weight, very capable soarers.

Glossy ibis, Plegadis falcinellus (A)
African sacred ibis, Threskiornis aethiopicus (I)
Eurasian spoonbill, Platalea leucorodia

Osprey
Order: AccipitriformesFamily: Pandionidae

The family Pandionidae contains only one species, the osprey. The osprey is a medium-large raptor which is a specialist fish-eater with a worldwide distribution.

Osprey, Pandion haliaetus

Hawks, eagles, and kites
Order: AccipitriformesFamily: Accipitridae

Accipitridae is a family of birds of prey, which includes hawks, eagles, kites, harriers and Old World vultures. These birds have powerful hooked beaks for tearing flesh from their prey, strong legs, powerful talons and keen eyesight.

Black-winged kite, Elanus caeruleus (A)
Egyptian vulture, Neophron percnopterus (A)
European honey-buzzard, Pernis apivorus
Cinereous vulture, Aegypius monachus (A)
Eurasian griffon, Gyps fulvus (A)
Short-toed snake-eagle, Circaetus gallicus (A)
Lesser spotted eagle, Clanga pomarina
Greater spotted eagle, Clanga clanga
Booted eagle, Hieraaetus pennatus (A)
Steppe eagle, Aquila nipalensis (A)
Imperial eagle, Aquila heliaca
Golden eagle, Aquila chrysaetos
Bonelli's eagle, Aquila fasciata (A)
Eurasian marsh-harrier, Circus aeruginosus
Hen harrier, Circus cyaneus
Pallid harrier, Circus macrourus (A)
Montagu's harrier, Circus pygargus
Levant sparrowhawk, Accipiter brevipes (A)
Eurasian sparrowhawk, Accipiter nisus
Northern goshawk, Accipiter gentilis
Red kite, Milvus milvus
Black kite, Milvus migrans
White-tailed eagle, Haliaeetus albicilla
Rough-legged hawk, Buteo lagopus
Common buzzard, Buteo buteo
Long-legged buzzard, Buteo rufinus (A)

Barn-owls
Order: StrigiformesFamily: Tytonidae

Barn owls are medium to large owls with large heads and characteristic heart-shaped faces. They have long strong legs with powerful talons. 

Barn owl, Tyto alba

Owls
Order: StrigiformesFamily: Strigidae

The typical owls are small to large solitary nocturnal birds of prey. They have large forward-facing eyes and ears, a hawk-like beak and a conspicuous circle of feathers around each eye called a facial disk.

Eurasian scops-owl, Otus scops
Eurasian eagle-owl, Bubo bubo
Snowy owl, Bubo scandiacus (A)
Northern hawk owl, Surnia ulula (A)
Eurasian pygmy-owl, Glaucidium passerinum
Little owl, Athene noctua
Tawny owl, Strix aluco
Ural owl, Strix uralensis
Long-eared owl, Asio otus
Short-eared owl, Asio flammeus
Boreal owl, Aegolius funereus

Hoopoes
Order: BucerotiformesFamily: Upupidae

Hoopoes have black, white and orangey-pink colouring with a large erectile crest on their head. 

Eurasian hoopoe, Upupa epops

Kingfishers
Order: CoraciiformesFamily: Alcedinidae

Kingfishers are medium-sized birds with large heads, long, pointed bills, short legs and stubby tails. 

Common kingfisher, Alcedo atthis

Bee-eaters
Order: CoraciiformesFamily: Meropidae

The bee-eaters are a group of near passerine birds in the family Meropidae. Most species are found in Africa but others occur in southern Europe, Madagascar, Australia and New Guinea. They are characterised by richly coloured plumage, slender bodies and usually elongated central tail feathers. All are colourful and have long downturned bills and pointed wings, which give them a swallow-like appearance when seen from afar.

European bee-eater, Merops apiaster

Rollers
Order: CoraciiformesFamily: Coraciidae

Rollers resemble crows in size and build, but are more closely related to the kingfishers and bee-eaters. They share the colourful appearance of those groups with blues and browns predominating. The two inner front toes are connected, but the outer toe is not. 

European roller, Coracias garrulus (A)

Woodpeckers
Order: PiciformesFamily: Picidae

Woodpeckers are small to medium-sized birds with chisel-like beaks, short legs, stiff tails and long tongues used for capturing insects. Some species have feet with two toes pointing forward and two backward, while several species have only three toes. Many woodpeckers have the habit of tapping noisily on tree trunks with their beaks.

Eurasian wryneck, Jynx torquilla
Eurasian three-toed woodpecker, Picoides tridactylus
Middle spotted woodpecker, Dendrocoptes medius
White-backed woodpecker, Dendrocopos leucotos
Great spotted woodpecker, Dendrocopos major
Syrian woodpecker, Dendrocopos syriacus
Lesser spotted woodpecker, Dryobates minor
Gray-headed woodpecker, Picus canus
Eurasian green woodpecker, Picus viridis
Black woodpecker, Dryocopus martius

Falcons and caracaras
Order: FalconiformesFamily: Falconidae

Falconidae is a family of diurnal birds of prey. They differ from hawks, eagles and kites in that they kill with their beaks instead of their talons. 

Lesser kestrel, Falco naumanni (extirpated)
Eurasian kestrel, Falco tinnunculus
Red-footed falcon, Falco vespertinus
Eleonora's falcon, Falco eleonorae (A)
Merlin, Falco columbarius
Eurasian hobby, Falco subbuteo
Lanner falcon, Falco biarmicus (A)
Saker falcon, Falco cherrug
Gyrfalcon, Falco rusticolus (A)
Peregrine falcon, Falco peregrinus

Old World parrots
Order: PsittaciformesFamily: Psittaculidae

Characteristic features of parrots include a strong curved bill, an upright stance, strong legs, and clawed zygodactyl feet. Many parrots are vividly colored, and some are multi-colored. Old World parrots are found from Africa east across south and southeast Asia and Oceania to Australia and New Zealand.

 Rose-ringed parakeet, Psittacula krameri (A)

Old World orioles
Order: PasseriformesFamily: Oriolidae

The Old World orioles are colourful passerine birds. They are not related to the New World orioles. 

Eurasian golden oriole, Oriolus oriolus

Shrikes
Order: PasseriformesFamily: Laniidae

Shrikes are passerine birds known for their habit of catching other birds and small animals and impaling the uneaten portions of their bodies on thorns. A typical shrike's beak is hooked, like a bird of prey.

Red-backed shrike, Lanius collurio
Great gray shrike, Lanius excubitor
Lesser gray shrike, Lanius minor (A)
Woodchat shrike, Lanius senator (A)

Crows, jays, and magpies
Order: PasseriformesFamily: Corvidae

The family Corvidae includes crows, ravens, jays, choughs, magpies, treepies, nutcrackers and ground jays. Corvids are above average in size among the Passeriformes, and some of the larger species show high levels of intelligence.

Eurasian jay, Garrulus glandarius
Eurasian magpie, Pica pica
Eurasian nutcracker, Nucifraga caryocatactes
Yellow-billed chough, Pyrrhocorax graculus (A)
Eurasian jackdaw, Corvus monedula
Rook, Corvus frugilegus
Carrion crow, Corvus corone
Hooded crow, Corvus cornix
Common raven, Corvus corax

Tits, chickadees, and titmice
Order: PasseriformesFamily: Paridae

The Paridae are mainly small stocky woodland species with short stout bills. Some have crests. They are adaptable birds, with a mixed diet including seeds and insects. 

Coal tit, Periparus ater
Crested tit, Lophophanes cristatus
Marsh tit, Poecile palustris
Willow tit, Poecile montana
Eurasian blue tit, Cyanistes caeruleus
Azure tit, Cyanistes cyanus
Great tit, Parus major

Penduline-tits
Order: PasseriformesFamily: Remizidae

The penduline tits are a group of small passerine birds related to the true tits. They are insectivores.

Eurasian penduline-tit, Remiz pendulinus

Larks
Order: PasseriformesFamily: Alaudidae

Larks are small terrestrial birds with often extravagant songs and display flights. Most larks are fairly dull in appearance. Their food is insects and seeds. 

Horned lark, Eremophila alpestris
Greater short-toed lark, Calandrella brachydactyla (A)
Calandra lark, Melanocorypha calandra (A)
Wood lark, Lullula arborea
Eurasian skylark, Alauda arvensis'
Crested lark, Galerida cristataBearded reedlingOrder: PasseriformesFamily: Panuridae

This species, the only one in its family, is found in reed beds throughout temperate Europe and Asia.

Bearded reedling, Panurus biarmicus

Reed warblers and alliesOrder: PasseriformesFamily: Acrocephalidae

The members of this family are usually rather large for "warblers". Most are rather plain olivaceous brown above with much yellow to beige below. They are usually found in open woodland, reedbeds, or tall grass. The family occurs mostly in southern to western Eurasia and surroundings, but it also ranges far into the Pacific, with some species in Africa.

Booted warbler, Iduna caligata (A)
Sykes's warbler, Iduna rama (A)
Eastern olivaceous warbler, Iduna pallida (A)
Melodious warbler, Hippolais polyglotta (A)
Icterine warbler, Hippolais icterina
Aquatic warbler, Acrocephalus paludicola
Moustached warbler, Acrocephalus melanopogon
Sedge warbler, Acrocephalus schoenobaenus
Paddyfield warbler, Acrocephalus agricola (A)
Blyth's reed warbler, Acrocephalus dumetorum (A)
Marsh warbler, Acrocephalus palustris
Eurasian reed warbler, Acrocephalus scirpaceus
Great reed warbler, Acrocephalus arundinaceus

Grassbirds and allies Order: PasseriformesFamily: Locustellidae

Locustellidae are a family of small insectivorous songbirds found mainly in Eurasia, Africa, and the Australian region. They are smallish birds with tails that are usually long and pointed, and tend to be drab brownish or buffy all over.

River warbler, Locustella fluviatilis
Savi's warbler, Locustella luscinioides
Common grasshopper-warbler, Locustella naevia

SwallowsOrder: PasseriformesFamily: Hirundinidae

The family Hirundinidae is adapted to aerial feeding. They have a slender streamlined body, long pointed wings and a short bill with a wide gape. The feet are adapted to perching rather than walking, and the front toes are partially joined at the base. 

Bank swallow, Riparia riparia
Eurasian crag-martin, Ptyonoprogne rupestris (A)
Barn swallow, Hirundo rustica
Red-rumped swallow, Cecropis daurica (A)
Common house-martin, Delichon urbicum

Leaf warblersOrder: PasseriformesFamily: Phylloscopidae

Leaf warblers are a family of small insectivorous birds found mostly in Eurasia and ranging into Wallacea and Africa. The species are of various sizes, often green-plumaged above and yellow below, or more subdued with grayish-green to grayish-brown colors.

Wood warbler, Phylloscopus sibilatrix
Western Bonelli's warbler, Phylloscopus bonelli (A)
Yellow-browed warbler, Phylloscopus inornatus (A)
Pallas's leaf warbler, Phylloscopus proregulus (A)
Radde's warbler, Phylloscopus schwarzi (A)
Dusky warbler, Phylloscopus fuscatus (A)
Willow warbler, Phylloscopus trochilus
Common chiffchaff, Phylloscopus collybita (A)
Iberian chiffchaff, Phylloscopus ibericus (A)
Greenish warbler, Phylloscopus trochiloides

Bush warblers and alliesOrder: PasseriformesFamily: Scotocercidae

The members of this family are found throughout Africa, Asia, and Polynesia. Their taxonomy is in flux, and some authorities place some genera in other families.

Cetti's warbler, Cettia cetti (A)

Long-tailed titsOrder: PasseriformesFamily: Aegithalidae

Long-tailed tits are a group of small passerine birds with medium to long tails. They make woven bag nests in trees. Most eat a mixed diet which includes insects. 

Long-tailed tit, Aegithalos caudatus

Sylviid warblers, parrotbills, and alliesOrder: PasseriformesFamily: Sylviidae

The family Sylviidae is a group of small insectivorous passerine birds. They mainly occur as breeding species, as the common name implies, in Europe, Asia and, to a lesser extent, Africa. Most are of generally undistinguished appearance, but many have distinctive songs.

Eurasian blackcap, Sylvia atricapilla
Garden warbler, Sylvia borin
Asian desert warbler, Curruca nana (A)
Barred warbler, Curruca nisoria
Lesser whitethroat, Curruca curruca
Eastern subalpine warbler, Curruca cantillans (A)
Sardinian warbler, Curruca melanocephala (A)
Greater whitethroat, Curruca communis
Dartford warbler, Curruca undata (A)

KingletsOrder: PasseriformesFamily: Regulidae

The kinglets, also called crests, are a small group of birds often included in the Old World warblers, but frequently given family status because they also resemble the titmice. 

Goldcrest, Regulus regulus
Common firecrest, Regulus ignicapillus

WallcreeperOrder: PasseriformesFamily: Tichodromidae

The wallcreeper is a small bird related to the nuthatch family, which has stunning crimson, grey and black plumage.

Wallcreeper, Tichodroma muraria

NuthatchesOrder: PasseriformesFamily: Sittidae

Nuthatches are small woodland birds. They have the unusual ability to climb down trees head first, unlike other birds which can only go upwards. Nuthatches have big heads, short tails and powerful bills and feet.

Eurasian nuthatch, Sitta europaea

TreecreepersOrder: PasseriformesFamily: Certhiidae

Treecreepers are small woodland birds, brown above and white below. They have thin pointed down-curved bills, which they use to extricate insects from bark. They have stiff tail feathers, like woodpeckers, which they use to support themselves on vertical trees. 

Eurasian treecreeper, Certhia familiaris
Short-toed treecreeper, Certhia brachydactyla

WrensOrder: PasseriformesFamily: Troglodytidae

The wrens are mainly small and inconspicuous except for their loud songs. These birds have short wings and thin down-turned bills. Several species often hold their tails upright. All are insectivorous.

Eurasian wren, Troglodytes troglodytes

DippersOrder: PasseriformesFamily: Cinclidae

Dippers are a group of perching birds whose habitat includes aquatic environments in the Americas, Europe and Asia. They are named for their bobbing or dipping movements. 

White-throated dipper, Cinclus cinclus

StarlingsOrder: PasseriformesFamily: Sturnidae

Starlings are small to medium-sized passerine birds. Their flight is strong and direct and they are very gregarious. Their preferred habitat is fairly open country. They eat insects and fruit. Plumage is typically dark with a metallic sheen.

European starling, Sturnus vulgaris
Rosy starling, Pastor roseus (A)

Thrushes and alliesOrder: PasseriformesFamily: Turdidae

The thrushes are a group of passerine birds that occur mainly in the Old World. They are plump, soft plumaged, small to medium-sized insectivores or sometimes omnivores, often feeding on the ground. Many have attractive songs.

Mistle thrush, Turdus viscivorus
Song thrush, Turdus philomelos
Redwing, Turdus iliacus
Eurasian blackbird, Turdus merula
American robin, Turdus migratorius (A)
Eyebrowed thrush, Turdus obscurus (A)
Fieldfare, Turdus pilaris
Ring ouzel, Turdus torquatus
Black-throated thrush, Turdus atrogularis (A)
Dusky thrush, Turdus eunomus (A)
Naumann's thrush, Turdus naumanni (A)

Old World flycatchersOrder: PasseriformesFamily: Muscicapidae

Old World flycatchers are a large group of small passerine birds native to the Old World. They are mainly small arboreal insectivores. The appearance of these birds is highly varied, but they mostly have weak songs and harsh calls.

Spotted flycatcher, Muscicapa striata
European robin, Erithacus rubecula
Thrush nightingale, Luscinia luscinia
Common nightingale, Luscinia megarhynchos
Bluethroat, Luscinia svecica
Red-flanked bluetail, Tarsiger cyanurus (A)
Red-breasted flycatcher, Ficedula parva
Semicollared flycatcher, Ficedula semitorquata (A)
European pied flycatcher, Ficedula hypoleuca
Collared flycatcher, Ficedula albicollis
Common redstart, Phoenicurus phoenicurus
Black redstart, Phoenicurus ochruros
Rufous-tailed rock-thrush, Monticola saxatilis
Whinchat, Saxicola rubetra
European stonechat, Saxicola rubicola
Northern wheatear, Oenanthe oenanthe
Desert wheatear, Oenanthe deserti (A)
Western black-eared wheatear, Oenanthe hispanica (A)
Eastern black-eared wheatear, Oenanthe melanoleuca (A)

WaxwingsOrder: PasseriformesFamily: Bombycillidae

The waxwings are a group of birds with soft silky plumage and unique red tips to some of the wing feathers. In the Bohemian and cedar waxwings, these tips look like sealing wax and give the group its name. These are arboreal birds of northern forests. They live on insects in summer and berries in winter.

Bohemian waxwing, Bombycilla garrulus

AccentorsOrder: PasseriformesFamily: Prunellidae

The accentors are in the only bird family, Prunellidae, which is completely endemic to the Palearctic. They are small, fairly drab species superficially similar to sparrows.

Alpine accentor, Prunella collaris
Siberian accentor, Prunella montanella (A)
Dunnock, Prunella modularis

Old World sparrowsOrder: PasseriformesFamily: Passeridae

Old World sparrows are small passerine birds. In general, sparrows tend to be small, plump, brown or grey birds with short tails and short powerful beaks. Sparrows are seed eaters, but they also consume small insects.

House sparrow, Passer domesticus
Eurasian tree sparrow, Passer montanus
White-winged snowfinch, Montifringilla nivalis (A)

Wagtails and pipitsOrder: PasseriformesFamily: Motacillidae

Motacillidae is a family of small passerine birds with medium to long tails. They include the wagtails, longclaws and pipits. They are slender, ground feeding insectivores of open country. 

Gray wagtail, Motacilla cinerea
Western yellow wagtail, Motacilla flava
Citrine wagtail, Motacilla citreola (A)
White wagtail, Motacilla alba
Richard's pipit, Anthus richardi (A)
Tawny pipit, Anthus campestris
Meadow pipit, Anthus pratensis
Tree pipit, Anthus trivialis
Red-throated pipit, Anthus cervinus
Water pipit, Anthus spinoletta
Rock pipit, Anthus petrosus (A)

 Finches, euphonias, and alliesOrder: PasseriformesFamily: Fringillidae

Finches are seed-eating passerine birds, that are small to moderately large and have a strong beak, usually conical and in some species very large. All have twelve tail feathers and nine primaries. These birds have a bouncing flight with alternating bouts of flapping and gliding on closed wings, and most sing well.

Common chaffinch, Fringilla coelebs
Brambling, Fringilla montifringilla
Hawfinch, Coccothraustes coccothraustes
Common rosefinch, Carpodacus erythrinus
Pine grosbeak, Pinicola enucleator (A)
Eurasian bullfinch, Pyrrhula pyrrhula
Trumpeter finch, Bucanetes githagineus (A)
European greenfinch, Chloris chloris
Twite, Linaria flavirostris
Eurasian linnet, Linaria cannabina
Common redpoll, Acanthis flammea
Lesser redpoll, Acanthis cabaret
Hoary redpoll, Acanthis hornemanni (A)
Parrot crossbill, Loxia pytyopsittacus (A)
Red crossbill, Loxia curvirostra
White-winged crossbill, Loxia leucoptera (A)
European goldfinch, Carduelis carduelis
Citril finch, Carduelis citrinella (A)
European serin, Serinus serinus
Eurasian siskin, Spinus spinus

Longspurs and snow buntingsOrder: PasseriformesFamily: Calcariidae

The Calcariidae are a family of birds that had been traditionally grouped with the New World sparrows, but differ in a number of respects and are usually found in open grassy areas.

 Lapland longspur - Calcarius lapponicus (A) 
 Snow bunting - Plectrophenax nivalis

Old World buntingsOrder: PasseriformesFamily': Emberizidae

The emberizids are a large family of passerine birds. They are seed-eating birds with distinctively shaped bills. Many emberizid species have distinctive head patterns.

Black-headed bunting, Emberiza melanocephala (A)
Red-headed bunting, Emberiza bruniceps (A)
Corn bunting, Emberiza calandraRock bunting, Emberiza cia (A)
Cirl bunting, Emberiza cirlus (A)
Yellowhammer, Emberiza citrinellaPine bunting, Emberiza leucocephalos (A)
Ortolan bunting, Emberiza hortulanaReed bunting, Emberiza schoeniclusYellow-breasted bunting, Emberiza aureola (A)
Little bunting, Emberiza pusilla (A)
Rustic bunting, Emberiza rustica'' (A)

See also
List of birds
Lists of birds by region
Fauna of the Czech Republic

References

Lists of birds by country
Lists of birds of Europe
Fauna of the Czech Republic
Birds